Florence Rice  may refer to:

 Florence Davenport Rice (1907–1974), American film actress
 Florence M. Rice (1919–2020), American consumer advocate